The 1948 Grand Prix season was the third post-war year for Grand Prix racing. It was the second season of the FIA's Formula One motor racing, though some of that season's Grand Prix still used other formulas. There was no organised championship in 1948, although several of the more prestigious races were recognised as Grandes Épreuves (great trials) by the FIA.  Luigi Villoresi proved to be the most successful driver, for the second consecutive year, winning six Grands Prix. Maserati's cars proved difficult to beat, winning 13 of the season's 23 Grands Prix.

Season review

Grandes Épreuves

Other Grands Prix

Statistics

Grand Prix Winners

Drivers

Manufacturers

References

Grand Prix seasons